Prunus bifrons is a species of Prunus native to temperate and tropical Asia.

References and external links 
 GBIF entry
 Sitzungsber. Kaiserl. Akad. Wiss., Wien, Math.-Naturwiss. Cl., Abt. 1, 101:637. 1892
 Rehder, A. 1949. Bibliography of cultivated trees and shrubs.

References

bifrons
bifrons
Plants described in 1892